Manawala  is  a city in Sheikhupura District, Punjab, Pakistan. It is situated on the Lahore-Sheikhupura-Faisalabad road.

History 

Prior to the Partition of India, Mananwala was established by and belonged to the famous Sikh Mann Sardars of Mughalchak, Gujranwala. Initially consisting of five large Havelis within a fortified perimeter, Mananwala has now expanded into a sizeable city of more than 9 square kilometres and with a population of over 50,000 people. In reference to this family, Lepel H. Griffin footnotes that "there is a saying, well known in the country, to the effect that three families in the Panjab, Attariwala, Mann, and Majithia, have possessed the greatest number of remarkable men. The Attariwala Sardars are brave and faithless. The Mann Sardars, handsome, gallant and true; the Majithias, wise and timid.”

Hari Ram Gupta accounts that in mid-eightheenth century, in order to establish and strengthen the Sukerchakia Misl, Charat Singh made four major matrimonial alliances, one of which was made with the Mann Sardars of Mughalchak. Sardar "Charat Singh's son Mahan Singh was married to the daughter of Sardar Jai Singh Mann of Mogalchak". Sardar Jai Singh Mann was the Sardar of the Mughalchak Misal, and led his forces alongside Sardar Charat Singh, the Sardar of the Sukerchakia Misl, in the military expeditions of Tsa Khel, Pindi Bhattiari, Gujrat, and Sialkot. Sardar Jai Singh Mann, with his younger brothers, Sardar Nar singh Mann, Sardar Mana Singh Mann, and Sardar Pahar Singh Mann, also marched with his forces to Jammu with Sardar Maha Singh when in 1780 the Sukerchakia and Mogalchak forces defeated Raja Brij Raj Deo. The union of marriage between the Sardar Charat Singh's son and Sardar Jai Singh Mann's daughter helped unite Mogalchaks and Sukerchakias, keeping in line with sardar Charat Singh's bid to strengthen the Sukerchakias misal. Other key matrimonial alliances made by Sardar Charat Singh were as with the Sardars Sohel Singh and Sahib Singh of the Bhangi Misl, and Sardar Dal Singh of Akālgarh.

Lepel H. Griffin records that the Mann Sardars were very powerful and continued to hold great prestige and fame even after the rise of Maharaja Ranjit Singh, with "at one point there were no fewer than twenty-two members of it holding key military appointments of great trust and honour". Griffin further articulates that Maharaja Ranjit Singh "often used to say that the Man Sardars were his "Wari Ka Tewar"," interpreted by Griffin as either 'the jewels of his court' or 'his best suit of clothes'.

The Mann Sardars of Mughalchak and Mananwala have several recognised cadet branches which are the once powerful houses of Bhagga under Sardar Amar Singh Mann, Ramnagar, Malwa,  Manawala in Amritsar, and include Sardar Kahn Singh Mann. Denzil Ibbetson notes that “the ‘mirasis’ or bards of the Mán Sardars of Mughalchak-Mananwala state that the whole of the Mán, Bhular and half the Her tribe of Rajputs were the earliest kshatriya immigrants from Rajputana to the Punjab. Due to which, the Mán, Bhúlar, and Her tribes (section 435) are known as the asl or ‘original’.”

See also
 Attari
 Majithia
 Sandhanwalia
 Mughalchak
 Gujranwala

References

Populated places in Sheikhupura District